Sanket Mahadev Sargar (born 16 October 2000) is an Indian weightlifter who holds the national and Commonwealth record of 256 kg in the men's 55 kg weight class. He won the silver medal at the 2022 Commonwealth Games in Birmingham with a total lift of 248 kg.

References

External links

Living people
2000 births
Indian male weightlifters
Weightlifters from Maharashtra
People from Sangli
Weightlifters at the 2022 Commonwealth Games
Commonwealth Games silver medallists for India
Commonwealth Games medallists in weightlifting
21st-century Indian people
Medallists at the 2022 Commonwealth Games